Châtignac is a commune in the Charente department in southwestern France. It has a population of 173 (2018).

Population

See also
Communes of the Charente department

References

Communes of Charente